The 2010 South Florida Bulls football team represented the University of South Florida (USF) in the 2010 NCAA Division I FBS football season.  The Bulls played their home games at Raymond James Stadium in Tampa, Florida. The 2010 season was the 14th season overall for the Bulls, and their sixth season in the Big East Conference.  This was the first season with Skip Holtz as the head coach at USF, and the first without the program's only head coach, Jim Leavitt, who was fired January 8, 2010.

On April 17, 2010, USF held its annual intersquad spring football game at Raymond James Stadium. 'Team South Florida' defeated 'Team Bulls' by a score of 49–31, in front of a record crowd of 6,357.

On November 3, USF defeated Rutgers 28–27, making it the 100th victory in the history of USF football.

Concluding the season, USF was invited to the Meineke Car Care Bowl to face the Clemson Tigers. It marked the 6th consecutive season that the Bulls have gone to a post-season bowl. USF defeated Clemson, 31-26, securing a 3rd straight bowl victory for the Bulls. Quarterback BJ Daniels was named the MVP of the game.

The Bulls finished the season 8–5, 3–4 in Big East play. It is the 5th straight season that USF has finished with 8 or more wins.

Schedule

References

South Florida
South Florida Bulls football seasons
Duke's Mayo Bowl champion seasons
South Florida Bulls football